Scoliacma albogrisea is a moth in the family Erebidae. It was described by Walter Rothschild in 1912. It is found in Papua New Guinea.

References

Moths described in 1912
Lithosiina